The United States Senate Committee on the Judiciary, informally known as the Senate Judiciary Committee, is a standing committee of 22 U.S. senators whose role is to oversee the Department of Justice (DOJ), consider executive and judicial nominations, and review pending legislation.

In addition, the Standing Rules of the Senate confer jurisdiction to the Senate Judiciary Committee in certain areas, such as considering proposed constitutional amendments and legislation related to federal criminal law, human rights law, immigration, intellectual property, antitrust law, and internet privacy.

History 
Established in 1816 as one of the original standing committees in the United States Senate, the Senate Committee on the Judiciary is one of the oldest and most influential committees in Congress. Its broad legislative jurisdiction has assured its primary role as a forum for the public discussion of social and constitutional issues. The committee is also responsible for oversight of key activities of the executive branch, and is responsible for the initial stages of the confirmation process of all judicial nominations for the federal judiciary.

Nominations 

The committee considers presidential nominations for positions in the DOJ, the Office of National Drug Control Policy, the State Justice Institute, and certain positions in the Department of Commerce and DHS. It is also in charge of holding hearings and investigating judicial nominations to the Supreme Court, the U.S. court of appeals, the U.S. district courts, and the Court of International Trade.

If a majority on the committee votes to advance a nomination, the nominee is reported favorably to the whole Senate, which can vote by simple majority to confirm the nominee.

Oversight 
The Judiciary Committee's oversight of the DOJ includes all of the agencies under the DOJ's jurisdiction, such as the FBI. It also has oversight of the Department of Homeland Security (DHS).

Members, 118th Congress (January 3, 2023 – January 3, 2025)

Chairs since 1816

Historical committee rosters

117th Congress (January 3, 2021 – January 3, 2023)

Subcommittees

116th Congress (January 3, 2019 – January 3, 2021)

Subcommittees

115th Congress (January 3, 2017 – January 3, 2019)

In January 2018, the Democratic minority had their number of seats increase from 9 to 10 upon the election of Doug Jones (D-AL), changing the 52–48 Republican majority to 51–49.  On January 2, 2018, Al Franken, who had been a member of the committee, resigned from the Senate following accusations of sexual misconduct.

Subcommittees

114th Congress (January 3, 2015 – January 3, 2017)

Subcommittees

113th Congress (January 3, 2013 – January 3, 2015)

Subcommittees

112th Congress (January 3, 2011 – January 3, 2013)

Subcommittees

111th Congress (January 3, 2009 – January 3, 2011)

Subcommittees

See also
United States House Committee on the Judiciary
List of current United States Senate committees

References

External links

United States Senate Committee on the Judiciary Official Website (Archive)
Senate Judiciary Committee. Legislation activity and reports, Congress.gov.

Judiciary
Law of the United States
1816 establishments in Washington, D.C.
Parliamentary committees on Justice